Clicks & Cuts, Vol. 3 is the third volume in the Clicks & Cuts Series released by Mille Plateaux in 2002. The double album was released as an attempt to investigate and define the glitch music aesthetic in its early 2000s popularity.

Track listing

Personnel
 Peter Fey - mastering

See also
 Mille Plateaux (Label)
 Glitch music
 Minimal techno
 Intelligent dance music
 Microhouse

External links
 Official label website
 Article on Clicks + Cuts Compilation at Salon.com

2002 compilation albums